André Nikolai Skjelstad (born 27 August 1965) is a Norwegian politician for the Liberal Party. 

He was elected to the Norwegian Parliament from Nord-Trøndelag in 2005. Prior to this he worked as a farmer, and served as Deputy Mayor of Verran and as a regional council member for Nord-Trøndelag County Municipality. Skjelstad has argued for diversification and investment in the region, to prevent stagnation and reliance upon the oil industry.

References 

1965 births
Living people
Politicians from Nord-Trøndelag
Members of the Storting
Liberal Party (Norway) politicians
21st-century Norwegian politicians